Christmas Rebellion may refer to:
Baptist War, also known as the "Christmas Uprising" and the "Great Jamaican Slave Revolt of 1831"
 Christmas Uprising - occurred in Montenegro after the First World War